Anne Home, Countess of Lauderdale (1612–1671) was a Scottish aristocrat.

Early life
Anne Home was a daughter of Mary (Dudley) Sutton, Countess of Home and Alexander Home, 1st Earl of Home.

She was born and christened in 1612. Anne of Denmark sent instructions to the chamberlain of her Dunfermline estates, Henry Wardlaw of Pitreavie, to distribute presents of money at the baptism, and Anna Hay, Countess of Winton was to be her representative.

As a child she lived in Old Moray House in Edinburgh. Her older sister Margaret Home married James Stuart, 4th Earl of Moray.

Lady Lauderdale
She married John Maitland in 1632, son of John Maitland, 1st Earl of Lauderdale. She inherited her mother's property and furniture in London, and was in London in October 1648, hosting her grandmother Theodosia Harington.

In 1648 her husband was declared a delinquent and so their possessions and furniture in London were forfeited and given to John Ireton and William Geere. Counter-claims that the furnishings belonged to their daughter or had been sold to a Scottish merchant in London, Robert English, were disregarded.

In the 1660s she and her husband John Maitland, Earl of Lauderdale, lived in London on Aldersgate Street and Lauderdale House, Highgate, properties which had belonged to her mother. Near the end of the 18th century the coat of arms of Maitland and Home were discovered at Highgate during repairs to the building. Their main home in Scotland was Thirlestane Castle.

In January 1662 she wrote to Sir John Gilmour of Craigmillar asking for his support in a lawsuit concerning the forfeited estate of a Quaker, John Swinton of Swinton. She signed this letter, "A. Lauderdaill".

They were lodged at Charing Cross in December 1668 and the Earl of Lauderdale's letters mention her illnesses, "much troubled with a cold", "much troubled with rheums", with swelling and pains to the face and throat. At the same time their infant grandson Charles Hay was ill with smallpox. His wet-nurse was given a posset drink of hartshorn with marigold flowers. Lauderdale was "most heartily weary" of a house filled with doctors and apothecaries. Perhaps in irony, Charles II took him to visit the physic laboratory of Nicasius le Febure in St James's Palace. Their second grandson John Hay was christened on 21 January 1669. Elizabeth, Lady Dysart's husband Lionel Tollemache died and Lauderdale visited her frequently in 1669.

Soon after she recovered from her illness Anne Home moved away from Lauderdale to Paris, on the advice of the king's physician Sir Alexander Fraser, so that she could take the waters at Bourbonne-les-Bains. Lauderdale sent her remittances from his lodging at court in Whitehall Palace. Lady Dysart made efforts to cover up her affair with Lauderdale by interfering with Anne Maitland's letters.

She wrote from Paris worrying about problems with her house at Highgate, at its core an Elizabethan building extended by her mother, which she called a "paper house". She thought Lauderdale's vast library had compromised the fabric.I heir that the hous of Hayghat is laik to fal, that part of it that my mother built, I was allways afeired that the gret weight that wos in the head of the hous wold bring a old hous on my head and so I bilive you have heard me say for it was bot a peper hous and not able to indeur no gret weight. I would desir you that you would cause carry your bouks doune to some of the roums below, and that you would make some people that hes skill to see it, and that it may be repaired in time or els it will fall doune this winter. You know it tis mine but for my lifetime, and then come to your posterity, and that it is not my power to leave it from them, therefore I make no doubt of your repairing of it, and in special since your books has been the occasion of it.Osmund Airy, The Lauderdale papers, vol. 2 (London, 1885), p. 203  
 
Anne Home, Countess of Lauderdale died in December 1671 in Paris.

Disputed jewels
Her husband married Elizabeth Murray, a daughter of William Murray, 1st Earl of Dysart in February 1672. Anne had bequeathed her jewels to their daughter Mary, Lady Tweeddale. The jewels were in the keeping of Anna Douglas, Lady Boghall, her companion in Paris, a daughter of her mother's servant Katherine Mansfield, and wife of John Hamilton of Boghall. She had also thought of giving them to her first cousin Frederick Schomberg, 1st Duke of Schomberg for safe-keeping. She had made a will in Paris, witnessed by Frederick Schomberg and Jean Claude, Minister of Charenton, bequeathing the jewels to her daughter, Mary, Lady Yester.

Lauderdale's agent in Paris, a Mr Waus who was shopping for the Countess of Dysart's wedding dress, obtained the jewels from Anna Douglas, Lady Boghall, and Lauderdale gave them to his new wife. Lawsuits over the jewels and the Tweeddale inheritance continued for several years.

Marriage and family
In 1632 Anne Home married John Maitland, 1st Duke of Lauderdale, a son of John Maitland, 1st Earl of Lauderdale and Isabel Seton, a daughter of Alexander Seton, 1st Earl of Dunfermline and Lilias Drummond. Their children included:
 Mary Maitland, who married John Hay, 2nd Marquess of Tweeddale in December 1666 at Highgate. They lived at Lauderdale House. The Marquess of Tweeddale complained that the Duke of Lauderdale had taken her inheritance in 1672 to support his second wife, Elizabeth Maitland, Duchess of Lauderdale.

References

17th-century Scottish people
17th-century Scottish women
Lauderdale
Daughters of British earls
1612 births
1671 deaths
Anne